Symphlebia fulminans is a moth in the family Erebidae first described by Walter Rothschild in 1910. It is found in Peru and Venezuela.

References

External links

fulminans
Moths described in 1910